Francisco O. "Frank" Mora is an American academic who has served as the United States ambassador to the Organization of American States since January 2023.

Education 

Mora earned a Bachelor of Arts in International Affairs at the George Washington University.  He received his Master of Arts. in Inter-American Studies and a Doctor of Philosophy in International Affairs from the University of Miami. He also studied at the Pontifical Catholic University of Peru in 1984 and participated in a program on Central American studies in 1988 in Costa Rica.

Career 

Mora served as Deputy Assistant Secretary of Defense for the Western Hemisphere from 2009 to 2013. He held several teaching positions, including Professor of National Security Strategy and Latin American Studies at the National War College at the National Defense University from 2004 to 2009, and associate professor and chair in the department of international studies at Rhodes College from 2000 to 2004. He previously served as director of the Kimberly Green Latin American and Caribbean Center at FIU’s Green School of International and Public Affairs. He is a professor of politics and international relations, and senior researcher, at the Jack D. Gordon Institute for Public Policy at Florida International University. He is the author of five books, including Neighborly Adversaries: U.S.-Latin American Relations (2015); Paraguay and the United States: Distant Allies (2008) and Latin American and Caribbean Foreign Policy (2003); and numerous articles and other publications.

Ambassadorship nomination 
On July 29, 2021, President Joe Biden nominated Mora to be the next United States Ambassador to the Organization of American States. On August 2, 2021, his nomination was sent to the Senate. Hearings were held on his nomination before the Senate Foreign Relations Committee on May 18, 2022. The committee favorably reported his nomination to the Senate floor on June 23, 2022. The Senate confirmed him by a 51–45 vote on December 14, 2022. He was sworn in on December 30, 2022, and he presented his credentials to the Organization of American States on January 18, 2023.

Awards and recognition 
Mora is a recipient of the Office of the Secretary of Defense Medal for Exceptional Public Service, Department of Defense.

Personal life 
Mora speaks Spanish and Portuguese.

References

External links

Living people
21st-century American educators
21st-century American writers
Year of birth missing (living people)
Place of birth missing (living people)
Florida International University faculty
George Washington University alumni
National War College faculty
Permanent Representatives of the United States to the Organization of American States
Rhodes College faculty
United States Assistant Secretaries of Defense
University of Miami alumni